Clearview is a rural incorporated township in Simcoe County in Central Ontario, Canada, west of Barrie and south of Collingwood and Wasaga Beach in Simcoe County.

History

Human occupation of the area is evident starting in as early as the Paleo-Indian period.

Before the arrival of European settlers, the area of Clearview Township was part of the territory of the Petun, a confederation of Iroquoians who were closely related to the Huron and Neutral peoples. The Petun were ravaged by disease epidemics in the early 17th century and victim to raids by the Iroquois Confederacy (a part of the Beaver Wars), with much of their remaining population fleeing as refugees and vacating the territory. There are abundant archaeological remains in the township from the Petun period.

Early settlement on the site of Stayner coincided with the construction of the Toronto, Simcoe and Huron Railway between 1851 and 1855. The community of Stayner, which was originally called Nottawasaga Station, developed into a significant agricultural and lumbering centre.  Stayner was incorporated as a village in 1872, and as a Town in 1888. The Village of Creemore was incorporated effective 20 November 1889.

Before incorporation, New Lowell was the site of a timber plant owned by Jacques and Hay.

Clearview Township was established on January 1, 1994, when the Town of Stayner, the Village of Creemore and the Townships of Nottawasaga and Sunnidale were amalgamated. The Townships of Nottawasaga and Sunnidale were incorporated in 1851 and 1858, respectively.

Geography
The township comprises the communities of Avening, Batteaux, Brentwood, Cashtown Corners, Creemore, Dunedin, Duntroon, Glen Huron, Maple Valley, New Lowell, Nottawa, Pretty River Valley, Singhampton, Smithdale, Stayner, Sunnidale, Sunnidale Corners and Websterville.

It borders on the following municipalities:
North Collingwood, Wasaga Beach
East Springwater, Essa
South Adjala-Tosorontio, Mulmur, Melancthon
West Grey Highlands, The Blue Mountains

Clearview (and Simcoe County in general) is part of Central Ontario as well as the Georgian Triangle. The climate in the area is classified as Humid Continental (Warm Summer Subtype).

Located in the Great Lakes lowlands, it has fertile soil quite suitable for farming. As a result of the proximity to the Great Lakes it suffers from Lake Effect.

Demographics 

Economy

As of 2006, compared to Ontario as a whole, Construction, Agriculture, and Manufacturing industries employ a greater than average percentage of the workforce (Business, Finance and Real Estate employ smaller than average). The employment rate was 67.1% (62.8% for Ontario) and the unemployment rate was 4.5% (6.4% for Ontario). 40% of the workforce worked outside the municipality and 13% worked from home.

The well-known Creemore Springs Brewery is located in Creemore.

Health Canada medical marijuana licensed producers The Peace Naturals Project and Agripharm Corp. produces their medicinal Cannabis in Clearview Township.

The Stayner Sun is the township's newspaper of record. It has published continually since 1877. The newspaper is owned by Metroland Media Group.

Attractions
Creemore was one of the original claimants for the location of Ontario's smallest jailhouse. Its jailhouse, with dimensions at 4.5 metres by 6 metres, make it smaller than the other early claimants, Tweed, Ontario and Coboconk; however, others in Rodney, Ontario, Port Dalhousie, Ontario, Providence Bay, Ontario and Berens River are smaller. Today, the jail has been converted into a museum.

There are two arenas (Stayner, Creemore), 3 Baseball Parks (Nottawa, Stayner, with the largest being in New Lowell) and 3 Golf Courses (Duntroon Highlands, Batteaux Creek Golf Club, Mad River Golf and Country Club) in Clearview. The Bruce Trail runs along the Niagara Escarpment in the western part of the township, and there is a cross-country skiing centre in Duntroon. Devil's Glen Provincial Park, Nottawasaga Lookout and Noisy River Provincial Nature Reserves, and Nottawasaga Bluffs, New Lowell, and Carruthers Memorial Conservation Areas as well as the Mel McKean Memorial Park, Gowan Memorial Park, Ives Park, Kinsmen Participark, and Legion Park are all green spaces located within the township. The Stayner hay monster is located at Fernwood Farm & Market. It is a monster made of hay.

The Great Northern Exhibition is held annually in Clearview Township.

Government
The township is administered by a Town Council with one member from each of the seven (numbered) wards, a Mayor and Deputy-mayor.

The administration of the town is divided into the Departments of Finance, Planning and Development, Public Works, an Administration staff as well as the Public Library and Fire Department. All the main administrative buildings of Clearview are located in Stayner.

The 2019 approved budget for the township was $28.98 million.

Infrastructure

Transportation

Major roads in Clearview include Highway 26, County Road 124, (formerly Highway 24, and a part of Hurontario Street), County Road 42 (formerly a part of Airport Road), as well as other county roads such as 7, 9, 10, and 91. Despite its name, Collingwood Airport is also located in Clearview.

Clearview Public Transit is a small system that runs in the Clearview Township operating one route that connects in Wasaga Beach. The system started November 21, 2016 and is operated by Sinton-Landmark.

The Simcoe County LINX inter-community bus service's 2 Wasaga Beach to Barrie route has stops in Clearview at the Brentwood Community Centre in Brentwood and the Clearview Administration Centre in Stayner.

Services

Clearview is served by Collingwood General And Marine Hospital in Collingwood. Policing services are provided by the Huronia West detachment of the OPP out of Wasaga Beach. Fire protection is provided by volunteer fire stations located throughout the township.

Education
Clearview township is served by the Simcoe County District School Board (SCDSB), Simcoe Muskoka Catholic District School Board (SMCDS) and the French Catholic School Board Conseil scolaire catholique MonAvenir. A number of schools, although located in other municipalities (specifically Collingwood, Essa Township and Wasaga Beach), have catchment areas that extend into Clearview.

While there is no post-secondary education in Clearview itself, the main campus of Georgian College is in nearby Barrie with a satellite campus in Collingwood nearby.

The Clearview Public Library maintains branches in Stayner, Creemore and New Lowell.

See also
List of townships in Ontario

References

Notable people
Tony Burgess (born 1959), Canadian novelist and screenwriter

External links

Lower-tier municipalities in Ontario
Municipalities in Simcoe County
Township municipalities in Ontario
1994 establishments in Ontario